Blue Matter is a studio album by jazz guitarist John Scofield that was released in 1986. It is the first of three recordings featuring Gary Grainger on bass guitar and Dennis Chambers on drums. The keyboards are played by Mitchel Forman with Don Alias providing percussion. Hiram Bullock is featured as second guitarist on three tracks.

Reception 
AllMusic awarded the album with 4 stars and its review by Scott Yanow states: "One of the top jazz guitarists from the mid-1980s on, John Scofield has always had a very recognizable sound and the ability to combine together R&B/funk with advanced jazz".

Track listing
All tracks written by John Scofield

 "Blue Matter" – 5:47
 "Trim" – 7:33
 "Heaven Hill" – 4:28
 "So You Say" – 4:34
 "Now She's Blonde" – 5:32
 "Make Me" – 2:53
 "The Nag" – 4:18
 "Time Marches On" – 7:32

Personnel
 John Scofield – electric guitar
 Mitchel Forman – keyboards
 Hiram Bullock – electric guitar on "Blue Matter", "Now She's Blonde", and "Make Me"
 Gary Grainger – bass guitar
 Dennis Chambers – drums
 Don Alias – percussion

References 

1987 albums
Post-bop albums
Jazz fusion albums by American artists
John Scofield albums
Gramavision Records albums